The Pindar River is a river located in Uttarakhand, India. Pindar originates from Pindari Glacier which is located in Bageshwar district of Kumaon region in Uttarakhand. Pindar glacier has relatively easier access and has been documented well for its retreat over 100 years. Pindar river mouth is located at Karnaprayag where it ends by its confluence with Alaknanda River.

Gallery

References

External links 
Pindar River on OpenStreetMap

Ganges
Rivers of Uttarakhand
Bageshwar district
Chamoli district
Rivers of India